Presidential elections were held in Chile in 1901. Conducted through a system of electors, they resulted in the election of Germán Riesco as President.

Results

References

Presidential elections in Chile
Chile
1901 in Chile
Election and referendum articles with incomplete results